Valiasr Metro Station is a station on Shiraz Metro Line 1. The station opened on 22 August 2017. It is located along Valiasr Square. The station is the closest to Shiraz Inter-city bus terminal.

References

Shiraz Metro stations
Railway stations opened in 2017